Lamplugh Inlet is an inlet  long, lying between Cape Healy and Cape Howard, along the east coast of Palmer Land, Antarctica. It was discovered by members of the United States Antarctic Service who explored this coast from East Base by land and from the air in 1940. It was named for Elmer L. Lamplugh, chief radio operator at East Base.

See also
Foster Peninsula

References

Inlets of Palmer Land